Jake Hoot (born July 7, 1988) is an American country singer. He was the winner of season 17 of the American talent competition The Voice at the age of 31.

Early life
Jake Hoot was born in Texas on July 7, 1988. Jake is the second oldest of nine siblings in his family. Their parents are Aaron and Stacey Hoot who are Christian missionaries. At the age of nine, he and his family relocated to the Dominican Republic where his parents lived and worked as missionaries from 1998 to 2008. He learned the guitar and began singing while in the country, developed a fluency in Spanish, and played in the Dominican baseball league for a year. Upon returning to the US he was homeschooled; in 2009 he attended Tennessee Tech. He had a back-up role playing football on Tennessee Tech's offensive line for his freshman year in 2010. He graduated with a degree in interdisciplinary studies in 2013 and found a job at a local media production company. At the same time he pursued his music career with many local gigs building his popularity.

Career

The Voice (2019)

In 2019, Hoot entered the 17th season of The Voice. In his blind audition, He sang "When It Rains It Pours" by Luke Combs. Only Kelly Clarkson turned her chair; thus he was on Team Kelly. He advanced to the finale winning the competition on December 17, 2019.

 – Studio version of performance was the most streamed song on Apple Music

After The Voice
"Better Off Without You", his coronation-winning song written by Hoot himself, became his first single. Hoot made his Grand Ole Opry debut on February 4, 2020.

Personal life
Hoot married  Jessica Lynn Steele, an Emergency Room nurse, in 2013 and had a daughter, Macy, born in 2015. He released some songs on YouTube singing to his daughter. The couple divorced in 2017. On March 7, 2021, he married Brittney Hoyt.

Discography

Singles

Other charted songs

References

External links
 - (September 30, 2019)
 - (December 17, 2019)

1988 births
21st-century American singers
21st-century American male singers
American country singer-songwriters
American new wave musicians
Living people
People from Corpus Christi, Texas
Republic Records artists
Singer-songwriters from Texas
The Voice (franchise) winners
Universal Music Group artists
American male singer-songwriters